Greenstock is a surname, and may refer to:

 Jeremy Greenstock, diplomat
 John Greenstock, cricketer
 Nick Greenstock, rugby player
 William Greenstock, cricketer

G